Schwartziella yragoae is a species of minute sea snail, a marine gastropod mollusk or micromollusk in the family Zebinidae.

Description

Distribution
This species is found in the Atlantic Ocean off the coast of the African nation Senegal.

References

yragoae
Gastropods described in 2003
Invertebrates of West Africa